Outbreak Europe is an annual international B-Boy competition organized by a streetwear and video production company The Legits and The Bboy Spot Europe taking place in Banska Bystrica, Slovakia during last week of July. The competition includes battles in 5 + 1 categories: 2 vs 2, 1 vs 1 Undisputed, 1vs 1 Bgirl, 1 vs 1 Kids, Cypher Kings and Rep Your Country crew battle. This 3-day event is notable for its uniqueness in featuring all 4 hip hop elements which are B-Boy, DJing, MCing and graffiti writing.

Winners

History
Outbreak Europe started in 2010 as the first official European qualifier for the Outbreak Hip Hop Festival - World Finals that was established by David “B-Boy Mex One” Alvarado of Unique Styles Crew in 2003 in Florida, USA. After the last edition of the Outbreak World Finals in Orlando, FL USA in 2013, the World Finals were moved indefinitely to Outbreak Europe, as the European qualifier became the eventual world championship event.

2010
First edition took place on July 1 – 4, 2010. Attendance at the event was 700 dancers and 200 visitors from 31 countries.

Judges:
  Roxrite (The Squadron Crew)
 Kid David (Renegades Crew)
 Keebz (Mind 180 Crew)

MCs:
 Mario Bee
 Lil Pablo

DJs:
 Lean Rock (The Squadron Crew)
 Renegade (Soul Mavericks Crew)
 Woo-D (Horse Power Crew)
 Piggo (StreetCom Crew)

Funk bands:
 COMP&NEROS

2011
Second edition moved to a new place within the city and was held on June 30 - July 3, 2011. Attendance at the event increased to 1050 dancers and visitors from 36 countries.

Judges:
 Lamine (Vegabonds Crew)
 El Niño (The Squadron Crew)
 Nasty Ray (The Squadron Crew)

MCs:
 Mario Bee
 Lil Pablo
 Mex One

DJs:
 Lean Rock (The Squadron Crew)
 Renegade (Soul Mavericks Crew)
 Woo-D (Horse Power Crew)
 Piggo (StreetCom Crew)

Funk bands:
 COMP&NEROS

2012
Third volume of Outbreak Europe took place on July 27 – 29,  2012. It was a special edition because Outbreak World Finals moved from USA to Slovakia. For the first time, bboys and bgirls could win Outbreak World Finals title directly at the event in Banska Bystrica. This year also featured new unique world championship in category country vs country called Rep Your Country. Attendance was 1200 people and number of attending countries increased to 53 countries.

Judges:
  Ken Swift (7 Gems Crew)
 Freeze (Ghost Crew)
 Roxrite (The Squadron Crew)

MCs:
 Mario Bee
 Lil Pablo
 Mex One

DJs:
 Lean Rock (The Squadron Crew)
 Renegade (Soul Mavericks Crew)
 Woo-D (Horse Power Crew)
 Scream (South Bboys Front Crew)
 Piggo (StreetCom Crew)

Funk bands:
 Champion Sound 
 COMP&NEROS

Graffiti writers:
 Spen One (Unique Styles Crew)
 Point 3 Crew
 Vaik (OSA Crew)
 Ceil (OSA Crew)

2013
Fourth annual was held on July 26 – 28, 2013. After special World Finals edition in 2012, bboys and bgirls battled to qualify and get to Outbreak World Finals in USA again. Attendance increased to 1350 dancers and visitors from 61 countries.

Judges:
 Alien Ness (Zulu Kings Crew)
 Focus (Flow Mo Crew)
 Jeskilz (Cypher Adikts Crew)

MCs:
 Mario Bee
 Lil Pablo
 Mex One

DJs:
 Lean Rock (The Squadron Crew)
 Renegade (Soul Mavericks Crew)
 Scream (South Bboys Front Crew)
 Smirnoff
 Ervin Arana (Cypher Adikts Crew)
 Plash (SSS Crew)

Funk bands:
 Champion Sound 
 COMP&NEROS

Graffiti writers:
 Point 3 Crew

2014
Fifth edition was a celebration of Outbreak Europe 5th anniversary and took place on July 25 – 27,  2014. It was an essential edition because European qualification became officially the World championship. This year was accompanied by new major event The Legits Blast Concert and Undisputed 1 vs 1 Battle qualification. The Legits Blast brought to Outbreak Europe live concert of legendary hip hop trio The Lords of the Underground from Newark, USA and concert of Slovak hip hop and funk band Krok Spet. Winner of Undisputed 1 vs 1 Battle advanced to Undisputed World Bboy Series championship. Attendees number reached 1750  people from 64 countries.

Judges:
  Poe One
 Hong 10
 Neguin

MCs:
 Mario Bee
 Lil Pablo
 Niko
 Osťo

DJs:
 Renegade (Soul Mavericks Crew)
 Scream (South Bboys Front Crew)
 Plash (SSS Crew)
 Smirnoff
 Fleg
 Felix
 Skizo
 Rawkuts

Concert:
 The Lords of the Underground
 Krok Spet
 Separ
 Zverina
 Champion Sound 
 Flue

Graffiti writers:
 Vaik (OSA Crew)
 Ceil (OSA Crew)

2015
Sixth edition took place on July 24 – 26, 2015. The Legits Blast brought to Outbreak Europe live concert of another American legendary hip hop trio M.O.P., and famous slovak trio Kontrafakt. Attendees number reached 2700  people from 70 countries.

Judges:
 Kid David (Renegades Crew)
 Menno (Def Dogz Crew)
 Ata (Ghost Crew)
 Lego (Flipside Kingz Crew)
 Roxrite (The Squadron Crew)

MCs:
 Mario Bee
 Lil Pablo
 Osťo

DJs:
 Lean Rock (The Squadron Crew)
 Fleg
 Renegade (Soul Mavericks Crew)
 Scream (South Bboys Front Crew)
 Plash (SSS Crew)
 Smirnoff
 Felix

Concert:
 M.O.P.
 Kontrafakt
 Krok Spet
 Špeker a Boco
 Flue

Graffiti writers:
 Vaik (OSA Crew)
 Ceil (OSA Crew)

2016

Seventh edition took place on July 29 – 31, 2016. The Legits Blast brought to Outbreak Europe live concert of The Beatnuts, and famous slovak Hip Hop artists Majk Spirit, H16, Moja Reč, Strapo, Boy Wonder and others. Attendees number reached 3200 people from 71 countries. In 2016 334 bboys, 114 bgirls and 225 2on2 participants entered the competition, making Outbreak Europe the largest bboy event in the world.

Judges:
 Abstrak
 Nasty Ray
 Bgirl AT
 Dyzee
 Lil John

MCs:
 Mario Bee
 Lil Pablo
 Osťo

DJs:
 Lean Rock (The Squadron Crew)
 Fleg
 Ervin Arana
 Renegade (Soul Mavericks Crew)
 Scream (South Bboys Front Crew)
 Plash (SSS Crew)
 Smirnoff
 Felix
 Shimo

Concert:
 The Beatnuts
 Sol
 Majk Spirit + H16
 Strapo
 Moja Reč
 Boy Wonder
 Krok Spet
 Špeker a Boco
 Flue

Graffiti writers:
 Vaik (OSA Crew)
 Ceil (OSA Crew)
 Ewil One (Point 3 Crew)

2017
Eight edition took place on July 28 – 30, 2017.

Judges:
 Poe One
 Yan
 Casper
 Reveal
 Renegade

MCs:
 Ivan Urban Action Figure
 Lil Pablo
 Osťo

DJs:
 Lean Rock (The Squadron Crew)
 Fleg
 Ervin Arana
 Renegade (Soul Mavericks Crew)
 Scream (South Bboys Front Crew)
 Plash (SSS Crew)
 Smirnoff

Concert:
 Onyx
 R.A. The Rugged Man
 Rytmus +  Live Band
 PSH
 Vec + Tono S. + Škrupo + Joe Trendy
 Supa & Jožis Engerer
 Flue Funk Band
 PJ & Funkdat

Graffiti writers:
 Vaik (OSA Crew)
 Ceil (OSA Crew)
 Ewil One (Point 3 Crew)

2018
9th edition took place on July 27 – 29, 2018.

Judges:
 Float
 Wing
 Poe One
 Felix
 Hatsolo
 Renegade

MCs:
 Ivan Urban Action Figure
 Lil Pablo
 Max
 Johnny Mečoch

DJs:
 Lean Rock (The Squadron Crew)
 Fleg
 Ervin Arana
 Renegade (Soul Mavericks Crew)
 Scream (South Bboys Front Crew)
 Plash (SSS Crew)
 Smirnoff
 Felix
 BJ Piggo

Concert:
 Das Efx
 Strapo & DJ Spinhandz
 Nerieš
 Majself
 PJ & Funkdat

Graffiti writers:
 Vaik (OSA Crew)
 Ceil (OSA Crew)
 Ewil One (Point 3 Crew)

Undisputed Outbreak Europe

2014

Individuals in bold won their respective battles.

2015

Individuals in bold won their respective battles.

2016

Individuals in bold won their respective battles.

2017

Individuals in bold won their respective battles.

2018

Individuals in bold won their respective battles. Undisputed #39.

References

External links 
 
FB page
Instagram

Talk:Outbreak europe

Breakdance